Luisa Striani (born 13 November 1978, in Benevento) is an Italian former swimmer who competed in the 2000 Summer Olympics.

References

1978 births
Sportspeople from Benevento
Living people
Italian female swimmers
Italian female freestyle swimmers
Olympic swimmers of Italy
Swimmers at the 2000 Summer Olympics
European Aquatics Championships medalists in swimming
Mediterranean Games silver medalists for Italy
Mediterranean Games bronze medalists for Italy
Mediterranean Games medalists in swimming
Swimmers at the 2001 Mediterranean Games